U.S. Army ST-488 is an  harbor tugboat, design 327-A, of the numerical series 885-490 built by J.K. Welding & Co shipyards in Brooklyn, New York in 1944. ST-488 was delivered May 1944 and served in the United States Army from October 1944 to 1946 in the French port of Le Havre and on the floating docks of the U.S. Mulberry harbour of Arromanches in Normandy. After a civilian career at the port of Le Havre until the late 1970s, saved from wrecking by volunteers, she became a museum ship in 1994, part of Musée maritime of Le Havre and was classified a Monument historique (historical monument) in 1997.

References

 Partial translation of the French Wikipedia article

External links
  https://remorqueurst488.wixsite.com/remorqueur-usst488/l-association      with historical details and photos. 

Ships of the United States Army
Tugboats
World War II auxiliary ships of the United States
Monuments historiques of Seine-Maritime
Le Havre
Museum ships in France
Museums in Seine-Maritime
1944 ships